Ugnė Mažutaitytė (born 14 March 1997) is a Lithuanian swimmer. She competed in the women's 100 metre backstroke event at the 2017 World Aquatics Championships. In 2019, she represented Lithuania at the 2019 World Aquatics Championships in Gwangju, South Korea. She competed in the women's 200 metre backstroke event and she did not advance to the semi-finals.

On 3 August 2022 Mažutaitytė announced her retirement from professional sport.

References

External links
 

1997 births
Living people
Lithuanian female backstroke swimmers
Place of birth missing (living people)
Swimmers at the 2014 Summer Youth Olympics